Northampton is a town  north of Geraldton, in the Mid West region of Western Australia. At the 2011 census, the town had a population of 868.The town contains a National Trust building. The town lies on the North West Coastal Highway. Originally called The Mines, Northampton was gazetted in 1864 and named after the colony's Governor, John Hampton. The town was sited in the Nokanena Brook valley, between the hamlets around the two major copper mines in the area, the Wanerenooka and the Gwalla.

It was the service town to the micronation, the Principality of Hutt River.

The town is known for its many wildflowers. Cave paintings at the Bowes River turnoff show that the region has been inhabited by Indigenous Australians.

The surrounding areas produce wheat and other cereal crops. The town has a receival site for Cooperative Bulk Handling.

History 
Lead ore was first found by explorer James Perry Walcott, a member of Augustus Charles Gregory's party, in 1848 in the bed of the Murchison River, establishing the mining industry in Western Australia. By 1864, 980 tons of lead ore and 230 tons of copper ore were exported from the district, representing 14% of the colony's total annual exports, exceeded only by wool (52%) and sandalwood (18%). By 1877 the district's exports of copper and lead ores had grown 350% and were the colony's second largest export, still at 14% of the total, after wool (53%).

The town was left under water by flooding in 1900 following torrential rainfall. The bridge over Nokanena Brook was swamped, with extensive damage; the water levels were the highest recorded in ten years.

In 1936, 4,628 tons of lead were produced from the Northampton field, followed by 6,163 tons in 1937. Most of this came from the Grand Junction mine, which was closed in 1938.

The Northampton State Battery opened in 1954 and operated for about 30 years leaving large amounts of tailings stockpiled. Locals removed the waste to use in buildings and other construction works. The battery was demolished in 2010 with the remaining tailings being sealed in a containment cell.

An investigation into lead contamination in the town commenced in 2013. The Northampton Lead Tailings Project aims to collect information on all land parcels around the town to determine extent of the distribution of lead tailings, which contain about 3% lead, in the area.

In April 2021 the town suffered serious damage from Tropical Cyclone Seroja after making landfall as an Australian scale Category 3 system north of nearby Gregory.

Heritage 
Northampton is one of the oldest towns in Western Australia, having been declared a townsite in 1864. It was classified as a "historic town" by the National Trust of Australia (WA) in 1993 in recognition of the important heritage buildings that have been conserved and which are still in use there. Notable among them are two buildings by the eminent priest architect Mgr Hawes. Most important is the Church of Our Lady in Ara Coeli, built . It is a romantic Neo Gothic, hammer dressed, sandstone building with some Arts and Crafts elements. Next to the church is the Convent of the Sacred Heart, also by Mgr Hawes, built in 1919 in a more conventional two storied Australian style with its deep sun-shading wooden verandahs. Both buildings are on the Permanent Register of the State Heritage Register of Western Australia.

Transport 
The first Western Australian government railway was constructed from Geraldton to Northampton, a distance of 33 miles 25 chains, and opened on 26 July 1879. An extension from Northampton to Ajana of 33 miles 5 chains was opened on 13 March 1913. The line closed on 29 April 1957.

Notable residents

 Sir David Brand (1912-1979), 19th Premier of Western Australia
Bradley John Murdoch, convicted murderer of English backpacker Peter Falconio
 William Burges (c. 1806-1876), established Bowes Estate, pastoralist, resident magistrate, MLC
 Jamie Cripps, Australian rules footballer
 Patrick Cripps Australian rules footballer
 John Drew (1865-1947), newspaper publisher, anti-federationist, Colonial Secretary, Minister for Agriculture, Minister for Lands, Minister for Education.
 Paul Hasleby, Australian rules footballer
 Herbert Johnson (1889-1962), federal Minister for the Interior
 Josh J. Kennedy, Australian rules footballer
 Andrew Lockyer, Australian rules footballer
 Samuel Mitchell (c. 1838-1912), pioneer of the mining industry in Western Australia, MLC, MLA
 Harry Taylor, Australian rules footballer

References

Further reading 
 Gibbs, M. (1997)  Landscapes of Meaning – Joseph Lucas Horrocks and the Gwalla Estate,  Northampton, Western Australia.  Historical Traces: Studies in Western Australian History, No. 17.  University of Western Australia Press.

 
Towns in Western Australia
Grain receival points of Western Australia
Mining towns in Western Australia